This is an incomplete list of conspiracy thriller films and TV series.

Films

TV series and miniseries

24

In the television series 24, many seasons plot involved a vast conspiracy from the government. For example, in season 5, terrorist took Ontario airport terminal passenger in hostage to take possession of a deadly gas. CIA had put gas there for terrorist to take it and explode it while in transit in Middle-East, providing a reason for United States to send troops in Middle East. In season 8, President Taylor tried to cover up the Russian involvement in IRK president.

Burn Notice 

A 2007 American TV series, airing on the USA Network, following the exploits of Michael Westen, a former covert operative for the American intelligence community who is stranded in his hometown of Miami after a burn notice is put out against him for reasons unknown. Although individual episodes of the series generally focus on Westen's work as an unlicensed private investigator and mercenary, the series' overall story arc involves his investigation of the reasons behind his burn notice and his discovery that he is a pawn in an international conspiracy.

Damages 

A 2007 American TV series, airing on the FX cable television network, following the exploits of Ellen Parsons, a naive and idealistic young lawyer who goes to work for Patty Hewes, one of the nation's wealthiest litigators. Told in flashbacks, the series relates Ellen's involvement in Patty's cases against high-flying corporate fraudsters, the murder of her fiancée, and her discovery that Patty can be every bit as ruthless and cruel as her opponents.

Edge of Darkness 

A 1985 British miniseries that ran for six episodes, following the exploits of Ronald Craven, a Yorkshire police officer who investigates the brutal murder of his environmentalist daughter and stumbles upon a web of corruption and deceit involving British and American intelligence agencies and revolving around the nuclear power industry.

Kidnapped 

A 2006 American TV series that ran for one season of 13 episodes, following the investigation into the kidnapping of Leopold Cain, son of Wall Street billionaire Conrad Cain. Although the case at first appears to involve a simple ransom demand, after the senior Cain brings in a mysterious "retrieval expert" named Knapp and an FBI agent named Latimer King becomes involved, it soon develops that the crime is actually the work of an international conspiracy, and that the motive is vengeance on the Cains themselves.

Law & Order 

An American TV series that combines elements of police procedural and legal drama, Law & Order has aired for 19 seasons since its debut in 1990, making it the longest running primetime drama on the television. Although not specifically a "conspiracy thriller" show, many episodes have focused on conspiracy theories taken in whole or in part from real-life news stories, as well as wholly original conspiracy plot lines. These include:

Law & Order: Criminal Intent 

A 2001 spinoff of the original Law & Order, this series focuses more on elements of police procedural, with the elements of legal drama associated with other shows in the franchise often almost non-existent. Although not specifically a "conspiracy thriller" show, many episodes have focused on conspiracy theories taken in whole or in part from real-life news stories, as well as wholly original conspiracy plot lines. These include:

Law & Order: Special Victims Unit 

A 1999 spinoff of the original Law & Order, this series focuses on investigations into sex crimes and crimes against children and the elderly. Although not specifically a "conspiracy thriller" show, several episodes have focused on conspiracy theories taken in whole or in part from real-life news stories, as well as wholly original conspiracy plot lines. These include:

Life 

An American police procedural which ran for two seasons and 32 episodes. In it, LAPD officer Charlie Crews, recently exonerated after serving 12 years in prison for a crime he did not commit, is returned to the force and promoted to detective, as well as receiving a sizable settlement. Although individual episodes of the series generally focused on Crews using his unique experiences and Zen Buddhist outlook to solve individual and unrelated murders, the series' overall story arc revolved around his secret investigation of the murders for which he was convicted, and his discovery that they were the result of an intricate conspiracy involving police corruption and the missing multimillion-dollar haul from a violent bank robbery shootout.

Nowhere Man 

The series explores the adventures of a photojournalist's efforts to uncover a conspiracy that has consumed his life. While at dinner in a restaurant, Thomas Veil (played by Bruce Greenwood) returns from the restroom to discover that no one knows who he is—including his wife. His entire life seems to have been erased. The only clue he possesses is the negative of a photo he took at a hanging conducted by American soldiers in South America.

Numb3rs 

An American police procedural featuring the exploits of FBI special agent Don Eppes (Rob Morrow) and his brother, Professor Charlie Eppes (David Krumholtz), a mathematics prodigy who applies his knowledge to solving crimes. Although not specifically a "conspiracy thriller" show, several episodes have focused on fictional conspiracy theories. These include:

Prison Break 

An American TV series, which ran for four seasons and 81 episodes from 2005 to 2009. In it, structural engineer Michael Scofield infiltrates the prison in which his brother, Lincoln Burrows, has been unjustly imprisoned for the murder of the Vice President's brother, a murder he did not commit. Eventually, the two successfully escape along with several other inmates and learn that Lincoln's framing was the work of a shadowy consortium of conspirators called "The Company". The two spend the rest of the series combatting the Company's machinations.

The series was temporarily rebooted for a mini event series (season 5) that aired from 4/04/17-5/30/17, containing 9 episodes, picked up where the original series left off, with one last escape. But this time it's not only escaping from prison, the gang has to escape an entire country with many people hunting them down. Lincoln Burrows hears rumors of his thought to be dead brother, Michael Scofield, might just be alive but living by a different name altogether (Kaniel Outis).

The Prisoner 

A British TV series, which ran for one season of 17 episodes from 1967 to 1968. In it, a British secret agent who has recently resigned his position is abducted by unknown forces and taken to a mysterious, idyllic village in an undisclosed location, which is seemingly populated entirely by other former agents of various international intelligence agencies. There, he is designated "Number Six", and a succession of interrogators, known collectively as "Number Two", attempt to extract the reason for his resignation from him via a variety of methods, including 24-hour surveillance, torture, double agents, mind control, hallucinogens, hypnosis, gaslighting, and a series of elaborate confidence tricks.

A Very British Coup 

A 1988 British miniseries, based on a novel of the same name by future Member of Parliament Chris Mullin. The series concerns the events following the election of an avowedly socialist Labour Party leader as Prime Minister of the United Kingdom on a platform of unilateral nuclear disarmament, withdrawal from NATO, nationalization of major industries, and other policies unacceptable to the power elite. Following his assumption of office, a conspiracy is hatched that includes high-ranking officials of MI5 and MI6, the CIA, and wealthy business moguls, who plot to bring down the Government through subterfuge, rather than violence.

See also 
 Conspiracy fiction
 Assassinations in fiction

References

Lists of films by genre
Thriller films by genre
Conspiracy
Lists of films and television series